The Flood Ladies were a group of international female artists who contributed artworks to the city of Florence following the catastrophic 1966 flood of the Arno as a sign of solidarity and to help repair the psychological damage done by the flood. The group was formed in Florence, Italy in 1966. Contributors to the collection lived all over the world. In 2014 the organization Advancing Women Artist Foundation headed an effort to preserve, exhibit and acknowledge the contribution of these women.

History
Following the devastating flooding that damaged and destroyed cultural treasures of Florence, Italy in 1966, while those losses can never be replaced, the generosity of some of Italy’s most significant women artists of the 20th century as well as distinguished painters and sculptors from around the world brought donations of hundreds of notable creative works to the city.

In 2014 the City of Florence opened the "Museum of the 1900s" to showcase these works.

The story of the Flood Ladies was chronicled in the 2014 book "When the World Answered. Florence, Women Artists and the 1966 Flood" and the 2015 PBS documentary of the same name.

Members and names
 Carla Accardi 
 Maya Berezowska
 Pasquarosa Bertoletti Marcelli 
 Stefania Giudi
 Edita Broglio
 Amalia Ciardi Dupré
 Lea Colliva
 Liliana Cossovel
 Maria Luisa De Romans
 Marianne Gabor
 Beatrice Lazzeri
 Fiora Leone
 Rita Longa
 Paola Levi Montalcini
 Titina Masell
 Daphne Maugham Casorati
 Costanza Mennyey Capogrossi
 Genni Mucchi
 Livia Papini De Rurmik Amelia Pelaez
 Pierca – Pier Carla Reghenzi
 Adriana Pincherle
 Antonietta Raphael Mafai
 Marcella Rusconi
 Imelde Siviero
 Sarai Sherman
 Rita Saglietto
 Paola Troise 
 Lesbia Vent Dumois

Bibliography
Jane Fortune,  Linda Falcone, When the World Answered: Florence, Women Artists and the 1966 Flood. The Florence Press l 2014
Advancing Women Artist Foundation. "Eight of the Flood Ladies" 2014

References

External links
When the World Answered (film)

American contemporary artists
Political art
Italian women artists
20th-century American women artists